The 1966–67 season was Galatasaray's 63rd in existence and the 9th consecutive season in the 1. Lig. This article shows statistics of the club's players in the season, and also lists all matches that the club have played in the season.

Squad statistics

Players in / out

In

Out

1.Lig

Standings

Matches

Türkiye Kupası
Kick-off listed in local time (EET)

1/4 final

Süper Kupa
Kick-off listed in local time (EET)

European Cup Winners' Cup

First round

Friendly Matches

TSYD Kupası

Spor Toto Kupası

Attendance

References

 Tuncay, Bülent (2002). Galatasaray Tarihi. Yapı Kredi Yayınları

External links
 Galatasaray Sports Club Official Website 
 Turkish Football Federation – Galatasaray A.Ş. 
 uefa.com – Galatasaray AŞ

Galatasaray S.K. (football) seasons
Turkish football clubs 1966–67 season
1960s in Istanbul